Black cod is a common name for several ray-finned fishes, none closely related to the true cods of order Gadiformes, family Gadidae:

 Order Scorpaeniformes
 Family Anoplopomatidae
Anoplopoma fimbria, native to the North Pacific, known as black cod or sablefish in North America
 Order Perciformes
 Family Serranidae "groupers"
Epinephelus daemelii, native to Australia and New Zealand, known as black cod in Australia
 Family Nototheniidae "cod icefishes"
Notothenia microlepidota, native to New Zealand and Macquarie Island, known as black cod in New Zealand
Paranotothenia magellanica, native to the Southern Ocean, known as black cod in New Zealand